The 1991 Portuguese presidential election was held on 13 January.

The re-election of the hugely popular Mário Soares was never in doubt, specially after the then-ruling PSD, led by Prime Minister Aníbal Cavaco Silva announced its support. Therefore, the election held on 13 January 1991 was a landslide, and no second round was needed.

As the election of a left-wing candidate was assured, other left-wing parties, the Portuguese Communist Party and the People's Democratic Union, presented their own candidates. The communists presented Carlos Carvalhas, who had been Assistant General Secretary of the Party a year before (Álvaro Cunhal was the secretary-general). Carvalhas would later be elected secretary-general, in 1992.

On the right, as the Social Democratic Party supported Soares, the Democratic and Social Centre presented the only right-wing candidate, Basílio Horta.

Mário Soares achieved the majority of the votes in every district of the country, and 295 of the then 305 municipalities. His score was the biggest ever in a presidential election in Portugal.

Procedure
Any Portuguese citizen over 35 years old has the opportunity to run for president. In order to do so it is necessary to gather between 7500 and 15000 signatures and submit them to the Portuguese Constitutional Court.

According to the Portuguese Constitution, to be elected, a candidate needs a majority of votes. If no candidate gets this majority there will take place a second round between the two most voted candidates.

Candidates

Official candidates
Mário Soares, Incumbent President since 1986 and eligible for a second term, supported by the Socialist Party, and tacitly by the Social Democratic Party;
Basílio Horta, Minister in previous governments, supported by the Democratic and Social Centre;
Carlos Carvalhas, supported by the Portuguese Communist Party and Ecologist Party "The Greens";
Carlos Manuel Marques, supported by the People's Democratic Union;

Decided not to run
Francisco Lucas Pires, Former leader of the Democratic and Social Centre (1983-1986);

Campaign period

Party slogans

Candidates' debates

Opinion polls

Results

|-
!style="background-color:#E9E9E9" align=left colspan="2" rowspan="2"|Candidates 
!style="background-color:#E9E9E9" align=left rowspan="2"|Supporting parties 	
!style="background-color:#E9E9E9" align=right colspan="2"|First round
|-
!style="background-color:#E9E9E9" align=right|Votes
!style="background-color:#E9E9E9" align=right|%
|-
|style="width: 10px" bgcolor=#FF66FF align="center" |
|align=left|Mário Soares
|align=left|Socialist Party 
|align="right" |3,459,521
|align="right" |70.35
|-
|style="width: 5px" bgcolor=#0093DD align="center" | 
|align=left|Basílio Horta 
|align=left|Democratic and Social Centre
|align="right" |696,379
|align="right" |14.16
|-
|style="width: 5px" bgcolor=red align="center" | 
|align=left|Carlos Carvalhas
|align=left|Portuguese Communist Party, Ecologist Party "The Greens"
|align="right" |635,373
|align="right" |12.92
|-
|style="width: 5px" bgcolor=#E2062C align="center" |
|align=left|Carlos Manuel Marques
|align=left|People's Democratic Union
|align="right" |126,581
|align="right" |2.57
|-
|colspan="3" align=left style="background-color:#E9E9E9"|Total valid
|width="65" align="right" style="background-color:#E9E9E9"|4,917,854
|width="40" align="right" style="background-color:#E9E9E9"|100.00
|-
|align=right colspan="3"|Blank ballots
|width="65" align="right" |112,877
|width="40" align="right" |2.21
|-
|align=right colspan="3" |Invalid ballots
|width="65" align="right"|68,037
|width="40" align="right"|1.33
|-
|colspan="3" align=left style="background-color:#E9E9E9"|Total 
|width="65" align="right" style="background-color:#E9E9E9"|5,098,768
|width="40" align="right" style="background-color:#E9E9E9"|
|-
|colspan=3|Registered voters/turnout
||8,202,212||62.16
|-
|colspan=5 align=left|Source: Comissão Nacional de Eleições
|}

Maps

References

External links
Portuguese Electoral Commission
 NSD: European Election Database - Portugal publishes regional level election data; allows for comparisons of election results, 1990-2010

See also
 President of Portugal
 Portugal
 Politics of Portugal

1991 elections in Portugal
1991
January 1991 events in Europe